The Peebles hoard is a Bronze Age hoard which was found near Peebles, Peeblesshire, Scotland in June 2020. It was discovered by Mariusz Stepien, a 44-year-old hobby metal detectorist, and the find was announced on 10 August 2020.

Discovery

The hoard was discovered on 21 June 2020 by Mariusz Stepien, a 44-year-old metal detectorist, originally from Poland but resident in Edinburgh, who had been metal-detecting for nine years. He immediately reported it to the Treasure Trove Unit and National Museums Scotland. The site was covered with a tent until the professionals arrived. There followed 22 days' work on site, during which Stepien and his friends camped in the field to protect the site and to observe the archaeologists' work, and the finds and surrounding soil were taken to the National Museums Collection Centre in Edinburgh. The find was announced on 10 August 2020.

Description
An in-situ  Bronze Age hoard:
Complete harness – with bronze fastenings, and organic traces of leather sufficiently detailed to reveal the tooling
Rattle pendant
Sword in scabbard – dated 1000 BC to 900 BC

Significance

Professional archaeologists were contacted before the site had been disturbed, allowing the items to be investigated in context and details of the leatherwork to be recorded. Bronze Age findings are rare in Scotland, and the artefacts establish a linkage between the people living  there 3,000 years ago and tribes in Northern Germany.

See also
Horsehope Craig Hoard, found at Manor Water, south of Peebles in 1864
Dowris Hoard, found at Dowris, County Offaly, Ireland in 1820s
Mooghaun North Hoard, found at Mooghaun North, County Clare, Ireland in 1854

References

Bronze Age Scotland
Metal detecting finds in Scotland
Peebles
2020 in Scotland